Adams Mill is an unincorporated community in Democrat Township, Carroll County, Indiana, United States.  It is named for an 1845 water-powered gristmill that is on Wildcat Creek.  The mill has been restored and is now a museum.

Geography

References

External links

Unincorporated communities in Carroll County, Indiana
Unincorporated communities in Indiana